A loophole is a weakness that allows a system to be circumvented.

Loophole may also refer to:

Loophole (firearm), a protected small opening to discharge a firearm
"Loophole" (short story), a short science fiction story by Arthur C. Clarke
Loophole (1954 film), a film about a bank teller
Loophole (1981 film), a film about a bank robbery
Loophole (2017 film), a film starring Chloe Lukasiak
"Loophole" (Law & Order: Special Victims Unit), an episode of Law & Order: Special Victims Unit
Loophole (album), an album by Sketch Show
Loopholes in Bell test experiments, an explanation for the outcome of certain experiments
Arrowslit, a loophole in a castle wall to launch arrows